Karakaya is a village in the Bayat District of Çorum Province in Turkey. Its population is 66 (2022).

References

Villages in Bayat District, Çorum